Puerto Rico's Monica Puig defeated Germany's Angelique Kerber in the final, 6–4, 4–6, 6–1 to win the gold medal in Women's Singles tennis at the 2016 Summer Olympics. It was Puerto Rico's first Olympic gold medal, and Puig became the first unseeded female player to win the Olympic tennis gold medal. In the bronze-medal match, the Czech Republic's Petra Kvitová defeated the United States' Madison Keys 7–5, 2–6, 6–2. It was Germany's first medal in women's singles since 1992 and the Czech Republic's first since 1996.

The tournament was held from 6 to 13 August 2016 at the Olympic Tennis Centre in the Barra Olympic Park in Barra da Tijuca in the west zone of Rio de Janeiro . The draw for the event was conducted at 11 a.m. local time on Thursday, 4 August. There were 64 competitors from 36 nations.

Background
This was the 13th appearance of the women's singles tennis. A women's event was held only once during the first three Games (only men's tennis was played in 1896 and 1904), but has been held at every Olympics for which there was a tennis tournament since 1908. Tennis was not a medal sport from 1928 to 1984, though there were demonstration events in 1968 and 1984.

Returning from the 2012 Games were gold medalist Serena Williams of the United States and quarter-finalists Angelique Kerber of Germany, Caroline Wozniacki of Denmark, and Petra Kvitová of the Czech Republic. The 2000 champion, Venus Williams, was also back for her fifth Olympic singles appearance (sister Serena was only on her third). Serena Williams and Kerber were the top two seeds this Games, with Venus #5.

Montenegro and Turkey each made their debut in the event. France made its 12th appearance, most among nations to that point, having missed only the 1908 Games in London (when only British players competed).

Qualification

Qualification for the women's singles was primarily through the WTA ranking list of 6 June 2016. An additional restriction was that players had to have been part of a nominated team for three Billie Jean King Cup events between 2013 and 2016 (with some exceptions). Nations had been limited to four players in the event since the 2000 Games. There were 64 quota places available for women's singles. The first 56 were assigned through the world ranking. There were two Tripartite Commission invitation places and 6 final qualification places allocated by the ITF based on continental and national representation along with world rankings.

Competition format

The competition was a single-elimination tournament with a bronze-medal match. Matches were in best-of-3 sets. A tiebreak would be played in all sets reaching 6–6 (previously, no tiebreak would be used in the third set of a match).

Schedule

Seeds 

  (third round)
  (final, silver medalist)
  (third round)
  (first round)
  (first round)
  (first round)
  (semifinals, fourth place)
  (third round)

  (third round)
  (quarterfinals)
  (semifinals, bronze medalist)
  (first round)
  (third round)
  (second round)
  (quarterfinals)
  (second round)

Draw 

 TRI = Tripartite invitation
 IP = ITF place

Finals

Top half

Section 1

Section 2

Bottom half

Section 3

Section 4

Participating nations

References

External links
 Women's Singles Drawsheet: Results
 Olympic Tennis Event
 Entry List

Women's Singles
Women's events at the 2016 Summer Olympics